Royal Air Force Llandow or more RAF Llandow is a former Royal Air Force station situated near the village of Llandow, Vale of Glamorgan, South Wales, 15 miles west of Cardiff.

It opened in 1940 and closed in 1957. It was while training at this airfield in 1941 that John Gillespie Magee, Jr. wrote his famous poem, "High Flight."

History

The major RAF unit based at Llandow throughout its existence was No. 38 Maintenance Unit RAF (38 MU) which was tasked with the reception, storage and despatch of RAF aircraft. 38 MU opened on 1 April 1940 and closed on 15 March 1957.

Other wartime RAF units were based at Llandow between June 1941 and July 1944. The first was No. 53 Operational Training Unit RAF B Flight equipped with Supermarine Spitfires which arrived on 24 June 1941. A satellite station at RAF Rhoose (now Cardiff International Airport) was used by this unit.  Three small transport flights were formed here during April 1944 with No. 1312 Flight RAF remaining based until 21 July 1944 with six Avro Anson I's for transporting urgent personnel to and from the Normandy landings area.

No. 614 (County of Glamorgan) Squadron had been formed at RAF Pengam Moors in June 1937 before moving away at the outbreak of Second World War.  Post war equipment required a larger airfield as base and Llandow was chosen.  The Squadron officially reformed here on 10 May 1946 and the first Spitfire Mk 16's were received in November, being replaced by Mk 22's in August 1948. Jet Equipment in the form of de Havilland Vampire fighters arrived in July 1950 and continued in use until disbandment of the squadron on 10 March 1957, with all Royal Auxiliary Air Force units.

Another long-resident post-war flying unit based at Llandow was No. 663 Squadron RAFs No. 1952 AOP Flight, equipped with Auster AOP.6 aircraft for spotting for local Territorial Army artillery units. This flight was based here from 1 July 1949 until disbandment in March 1957.

The RAF's Burmese Conversion Squadron was based here for a period from 1953 to familiarise Burmese pilots with their newly acquired ex-RAF Supermarine Spitfire fighters.

No. 4 Civilian Anti-Aircraft Co-operation Unit was based at RAF Llandow between 1 August 1951 and 1 July 1954 equipped with de Havilland Mosquito and Spitfire aircraft to tow targets and act as targets for army units in South Wales and nearby areas.

The Llandow air disaster occurred on 12 March 1950 when an Avro Tudor V airliner G-AKBY of Airflight crashed on final approach to runway 28 at RAF Llandow. The aircraft was returning from Dublin Airport with five crew and 80 rugby supporters, all except three passengers being killed.

Units

The following units were here at some point:

Current Use

The airfield is now in use as Llandow Kart Club and Llandow Circuit, with the main runways of the former RAF base being used as Hangar Straight and Spitfire Straight in the kart circuit. The names of the corners and straights of the kart circuit reference Llandow's history as an airfield, with names such as Hangar Straight, Bomber Straight, Lancaster Curve and Spitfire Straight.

References

Citations

Bibliography

 Halley, James J. The Squadrons of the Royal Air Force and Commonwealth, 1918-1988. Tonbridge, Kent, UK: Air-Britain (Historians) Ltd., 1988, . 

 Sturtivant, Ray ISO and John Hamlin. RAF Flying Training and Support Units since 1912. Tonbridge, Kent, UK: Air-Britain (Historians) Ltd., 1997, .

Royal Air Force stations in Wales
Organisations based in the Vale of Glamorgan
Royal Air Force stations of World War II in the United Kingdom